Ramani Nallathambi is an Indian politician and former Member of the Legislative Assembly. She was elected to the Tamil Nadu legislative assembly as an Indian National Congress candidate from Radhapuram constituency in 1989 and 1991 elections.

References 

Indian National Congress politicians from Tamil Nadu
Living people
Year of birth missing (living people)
Tamil Nadu MLAs 1991–1996